Melinda Mullins (born April 20, 1958) is an American film, television and theatre actress.

Early life and education

She earned her Bachelor of Arts degree in the Romance languages from Mount Holyoke College in South Hadley, Massachusetts, in 1979. She also studied at the Juilliard School in New York City, New York, and the Conservatoire National Supérieur d'Art Dramatique in Paris. She also took the Alan Weiss Broadcasting Course and Michael Shurtleff's Scene Study and Audition Class.

Career
Mullins has appeared in numerous roles in film, television and on the Broadway stage. While appearing in several TV series, such as  M*A*S*H or Law & Order, Mullins may be best known for her role as former Broadway leading lady Hilary Booth in Rupert Holmes' Remember WENN. Mullins, who also writes screenplays and short stories, has been married to actor/author Joshua Bryant, who appeared as Jack Scully on M*A*S*H, since 2005; the couple currently resides in France.

Filmography
 1982: M*A*S*H (Martine LeClerc)
 1987: Crossbow (Blade)
 1989: Prisoners of Inertia (Charlotte)
 1991: What About Bob? (Marie Grady)
 1992: Law & Order (Forensics Technician)
 1993: Dennis the Menace (Andrea)
 1995: Law & Order (Chris Chappel)
 1996: Rescuing Desire (Toni)
 1996-98: Remember WENN (Hilary Booth)

Broadway
Mastergate (Merry Chase)
Serious Money (Scilla)
Sherlock's Last Case (Liza/Damion)

Off-Broadway and Regional
Escape from Happiness (Elizabeth)
Titus Andronicus (Tamora)
Macbeth (Lady Macbeth)
Adoining Trances (C. McCullers)
Measure for Measure (Isabella)
Midsummer Night's Dream (Titania/Hippolyta)
Twelfth Night (Olivia)
The Play's the Thing (Mona)
Wild Oats (Honest Bob)
Amerika (Chorus)

Awards and nominations
1986 - B.H. Barry Stagefighting Prize
1996 - Screen Actors Guild Award Nomination
1999 - New York Festival Award: Outstanding Performance in a Comedy Series
1999 - Chicago International Television Festival Outstanding Achievement in Acting

External links
 
 
 melindamullins.com, Melinda Mullins official website

1958 births
Living people
American film actresses
American stage actresses
American television actresses
Mount Holyoke College alumni